Viloco (Aymara Wiluqu, a kind of bird) is a small town in Bolivia located in the La Paz Department, Loayza Province, Cairoma Municipality.

References

Populated places in La Paz Department (Bolivia)